The Queen's Head is a pub at 8 Flamborough Street, Stepney, London E14.

It is a Grade II listed building, built in the late 18th/ early 19th century.

References

External links
 
 

Grade II listed pubs in London
Pubs in the London Borough of Tower Hamlets
Grade II listed buildings in the London Borough of Tower Hamlets